Matthew S. "Matt" Lehman is an American Republican politician from Indiana. He represents District 79 and is the majority floor leader in the Indiana House of Representatives.

References

External links 
 Official website

|-

21st-century American politicians
Living people
Republican Party members of the Indiana House of Representatives
Vincennes University alumni
Year of birth missing (living people)